A manor house was historically the main residence of the lord of the manor in Europe. The house formed the administrative centre of a manor in the European feudal system; within its great hall were held the lord's manorial courts, communal meals with manorial tenants and great banquets. The term is today loosely applied to various country houses, frequently dating from the late medieval era, which formerly housed the gentry.

Denmark

 Berritzgaard Manor
 Børglum Abbey
 Clausholm Castle
 Dragsholm Castle
 Egeskov Castle
 Fuglsang Manor
 Gavnø Castle
 Glorup Manor
 Krogerup Manor
 Nysø Manor
 Rosenholm Castle
 Skjoldenæsholm Castle
 Svanholm Manor
 Vemmetofte Convent
 Gammel Estrup

Estonia
See: List of palaces and manor houses in Estonia

Finland

 Malmgård
 Numlax
  Sarvlax 
  Stensböle 
  Esbogård 
 Träskända
  Alberga 
  Vuojoki 
  Sjundby 
  Svidja 
  Qvidja 
  Kankas 
 Villnäs

France

Germany
See: List of castles, palaces and manor houses in Germany

 Gut Altenhof  in Dänischer Wohld
Schloss Bothmer in Klütz
 Gut Blomenburg  in Selent
 Gut Brodau  in Ostholstein
 Gut Emkendorf  in Emkendorf
Essenrode Manor in Essenrode
Schloss Glücksburg on Angeln
 Gut Knoop  in Dänischer Wohld
Gut Krummbek
 Gut Panker  in Ostholstein
 Gut Projensdorf  in Dänischer Wohld
 Gut Salzau  in Fargau-Pratjau
 Gut Wahlstorf  in Otterndorf
Gut Wellingsbüttel
 Gut Wotersen  in Herzogtum Lauenburg
Schloss Ahrensburg in Ahrensburg
Nütschau Priory in Travenbrück
Rittergut Kürbitz
Villa Haas in Hesse

In Great Britain and Ireland

Channel Islands
 Sausmarez Manor in Guernsey
 Samarès Manor in Jersey
 Les Augrès Manor, Jersey
 Longueville Manor, Jersey
 Saint Ouen's Manor, Jersey
 Sark Manor, Sark

England

Ireland
 Dunboy Castle, is located on the Beara Peninsula in south-west Ireland
 Ballylickey Manor House on Bantry Bay
 Temple House, Ballymote, County Sligo
 Mount Juliet Estate Manor House, Country Kilkenny
 Temple House Manor,  County Westmeath 
 Bunratty House, County Clare

Northern Ireland
Killadeas, 'Manor House Hotel', County Fermanagh
Richhill Castle, County Armagh

Scotland

Brodie Castle
Drum Castle, started as a 13th-century tower house.
Foulis Castle
Haddo House
House of Dun
Inveresk Manor House
Lingo House
Monboddo House
Muchalls Castle
Raasay

Wales
Bodysgallen Hall near Conwy Castle
Gwydir Castle, Conwy valley, North Wales
Weobley Castle, Gower
Tretower Court near Crickhowell
 Llancaiach fawr near Abercynon and Ystrad Mynach

Latvia
See: List of palaces and manor houses in Latvia

Netherlands

Huis Doorn (Doorn, near Utrecht)
Slot Heemstede (Heemstede, near Haarlem)

Norway

 Austrått Castle
 Fritzøehus Castle
 Damsgård Manor
 Eidsvollsbygningen
  Fossum hovedgård 
 Frogner Manor
  Frogner Hovedgård (Skien) 
 Linderud gård
 Jarlsberg Manor
 Store Milde Hovedgård

Poland

Abbot's Palace (Oliwa)
Bachorza manor
Branicki Palace, Białystok
Castle in Pszczyna
Czerniejewo
Dzików Castle
Jabłonna Palace
Krasiczyn Palace
Kozłówka Palace
Krasków, Lower Silesian Voivodeship
Kurozwęki Palace
Książ
Łańcut Castle
Nieborów
Owińska
Pabianice
Pawłowice
Pławowice
Przeworsk
Przyszowice
Racot
Rogalin
Rydzyna Castle
Śmiełów
Świerklaniec
Sztynort
Turew
Walewice
Wilanów Palace
Żelazowa Wola

Portugal

Solar da Madre de Deus
Solar de Mateus
Solar dos Matas
Quinta da Regaleira
Solar de Sezim

Russia

Abramtsevo
Arkhangelskoye
Grebnevo
Kuskovo
Ligovo
Meyendorf
Muranovo
Ostankino
Priory Palace
Ropsha
Rozhdestveno
Sergiyevka
Strelna
Tarkhany
Yasnaya Polyana
Yelagin Palace
 Znamenka (residence)

Spain

 Archbishop's Palace of Alcalá de Henares
 Archbishop's Palace, Seville
 Alcázar of Toledo
 Alcázar of Seville
 Alcázar de los Reyes Cristianos
 Alcázar of Segovia
 Cortijo de Miraflores
 Cortijo Jurado
 Liria Palace
 Palace of Zarzuela
 Palace of Moncloa
 Palace of the Borgias
 Pazo de Meirás
 Royal Palace of Madrid
 Royal Palace of El Pardo
 Royal Palace of Aranjuez
 Royal Palace of La Granja de San Ildefonso
 Royal Palace of Riofrío
 Royal Palace of La Almudaina

Sweden

 Augerum
 Charlottenborg
 Djupadals
 Elleholms
 Göholms
 Halltorp
 Harpsund
 Marielund
 Övralid
 Skärva
 Ström
 Tromtö

North America

United States

All manors in North America are mostly located in the United States.

Old Westbury Gardens
Arlington
Biltmore Estate
Berkeley
Berry Hill
Bloedel Reserve
Boone Hall
Brandon
Bremo
Evelynton
Gunston Hall
Oheka Castle
Orton
Vanderbilt Mansion National Historic Site
Filoli
Kykuit
Monticello
Mount Vernon
Skylands
Nemours Mansion and Gardens
Coe Hall
Prestwould
Pennsbury Manor
Carter's Grove
Spelling Manor
The Breakers
Hearst Castle
Rosewell
Stratford Hall
Villa Vizcaya
Winterthur
Rough Point
Westover
Wilton

Canada

A few manors are found in Canada and most are in Quebec:

 Willistead Manor -  Walkerville, Ontario 
  Manoir Rouville-Campbell  - Mont-Saint-Hilaire, Quebec
  Manoir Taschereau  - Sainte-Marie, Quebec
  Manoir Bleury-Bouthillier  - Rosemère, Quebec
  Manoir Louis-Joseph-Papineau  -  Montebello, Québec 
  Manoir Mauvide-Genest  -  Saint-Jean-de-l'Île-d'Orléans, Québec

References

External links
 Eesti mõisate loend (List of Estonian manors in Estonian Wikipedia)
 Liste des châteaux de Bretagne (List of Breton manor houses in the French Wikipedia)
 Luettelo Suomen kartanoista (List of Finnish manor houses in the Finnish Wikipedia)
 There is a short list of Norman manoirs in Pays de Caux.
 Lijst van kastelen in Nederland (From the Dutch Wikipedia, a comprehensive list of castles and manor houses in the Netherlands)
 Lijst van kastelen in België (From the Dutch Wikipedia, a comprehensive list of castles and manor houses in Belgium)

House types
Manor houses